is a former Japanese football player.

Club statistics

References

External links

j-league

1987 births
Living people
Chuo University alumni
Association football people from Yamanashi Prefecture
Japanese footballers
J2 League players
Mito HollyHock players
Association football goalkeepers